Nebi Sefa(1861 - 2 November 1942) was a 19th-century Albanian politician. He was one of the signatories of the Albanian Declaration of Independence.

References

19th-century Albanian people
Signatories of the Albanian Declaration of Independence
Albanian politicians
1861 births
1942 deaths
People from Lushnjë
All-Albanian Congress delegates